The Joseph Goebbels Cabinet was named by Adolf Hitler in his political testament of 30 April 1945. To replace himself, Hitler named Admiral Karl Dönitz as Reichspräsident and Propaganda Minister Joseph Goebbels as Reichskanzler. The cabinet was short-lived as Goebbels killed himself along with his family on 1 May. His government was followed by the Flensburg Government under Dönitz.

Composition

Retaining some members from the previous Hitler cabinet, some members of the Goebbels cabinet would continue in the Dönitz cabinet.

References 

Historic German cabinets
1945 in Germany